The 125th Independent Brigade of the Territorial Defense Forces is a military formation of the Territorial Defense Forces of Ukraine in Lviv. It is part of Operational Command West.

History

Formation 
On 27 February 2022 the brigade was formed in Lviv. In early March Brigade was actively recruiting reservists and was in organizational process. Its purpose was protection of Lviv, its strategic facilities, protection of government facilities and counter-sabotage. Brigade was fully formed on 12 March. Lt Gen Artur Horbenko was assigned to command it.

Russo-Ukrainian War

2022 Russian invasion of Ukraine
As of 13 August, Brigade had lost 9 soldiers. Units of the Brigade along with other formations of the Ukrainian Armed Forces liberated following villages and settlements in Donetsk Oblast: Ozerne, Dibrova, Yampil and Torske. As of December 2022, units if the Brigade were deployed to Kharkiv Oblast, Sumy Oblast and Donetsk Oblast. On 4 December, the brigade received its battle flag. In February 2023, Medics from Brigade were serving in Bakhmut.

Structure 
As of 2022 the brigade's structure is as follows:
 Headquarters
 215th Territorial Defense Battalion
 216th Territorial Defense Battalion
 217th Territorial Defense Battalion
 218th Territorial Defense Battalion
 219th Territorial Defense Battalion
 Counter-Sabotage Company
 Engineering Company
 Communication Company
 Logistics Company
 Mortar Battery

Commanders 
 Lt Gen Artur Horbenko 2022 - present

See also 
 Territorial Defense Forces of the Armed Forces of Ukraine

References 

Territorial defense Brigades of Ukraine
2022 establishments in Ukraine
Military units and formations established in 2022